Yeung Uk Tsuen is a village in Shap Pat Heung, Yuen Long District, Hong Kong.

Administration
Yeung Uk Tsuen is a recognized village under the New Territories Small House Policy. For electoral purposes, Yeung Uk Tsuen is located in the Shap Pat Heung East constituency of the Yuen Long District Council. It was formerly represented by Lee Chun-wai, who was elected in the 2019 elections until July 2021.

References

External links

 Delineation of area of existing village Yeung Uk Tsuen (Shap Pat Heung) for election of resident representative (2019 to 2022)
 Antiquities Advisory Board. Historic Building Appraisal. Yeung Ancestral Hall, Yeung Uk Tsuen, Shap Pat Heung Pictures
 Antiquities Advisory Board. Historic Building Appraisal. No. 86, 87, 88 Yeung Uk Tsuen, Shap Pat Heung Pictures No. 86 No. 87 No. 88

Villages in Yuen Long District, Hong Kong
Shap Pat Heung